Swansea won the second Welsh-Scottish League.

2000-2001 League Table

The top 5 Welsh teams plus Glasgow and Edinburgh qualified for next season's Heineken Cup.

Results

Round 1

Round 2

Round 3

Round 4

Round 5

Round 6

Round 7

Round 8

Round 9

Round 10

Round 11

Round 12

Round 13

Round 14

Round 15

Round 16

Round 17

Round 18

Round 19

Round 20

Round 21

Round 22

References

1999–2000
2000–01 in Scottish rugby union
2000–01 in Welsh rugby union
2000–01 in British rugby union
2000–01 in European rugby union leagues